Shirinsky District (Khakas: , Sıra aymağı) is an administrative and municipal district (raion), one of the eight in the Republic of Khakassia, Russia. It is located in the north of the republic. Its administrative center is the rural locality (a selo) of Shira. Population:  The population of Shira accounts for 32.2% of the district's total population.

References

Notes

Sources

Districts of Khakassia